Marilyn Golden (March 22, 1954 – September 21, 2021) was an American disability rights activist, most notably in the area of transportation. For many years she was a Policy Analyst at the Disability Rights Education and Defense Fund (DREDF). She served on the U.S. Architectural and Transportation Barriers Compliance Board from 1996 until 2005. She had previously worked as the Director of Access California, which was a "resource center on architectural accessibility run by the City of Oakland". She also worked as Co-Coordinator of the Disabled International Support Effort, which aided disability organizations in developing nations. She opposed assisted suicide and fought against assisted suicide legislation in California, Hawaii, and Vermont. She also lobbied for the Americans with Disabilities Act of 1990.

Golden was the daughter of Aaron and Clarice (Lerner) Golden. She grew up in San Antonio, Texas, and was Jewish. While a student at Brandeis University, she had a fall that severely injured her back, and following a long rehabilitation she used a wheelchair. She graduated from Brandeis University in 1977. Her companion was Rabbi David J. Cooper, and she had two stepchildren Talia Cooper and Lev Hirschhorn. In 2015 she was honored by the White House as a transportation "Champion of Change."

Selected publications

References

External links

1954 births
2021 deaths
Brandeis University alumni
American disability rights activists
Jewish American activists
People from San Antonio